David Howie may refer to:

 Dave Howie (1888–1916), Scottish rugby union player
 David Howie (footballer) (1886–1930), Scottish footballer
 David Howie (curler), Scottish curler

See also
 David W. Howie House, Milwaukee, Wisconsin